John Dicks may refer to:
John Dicks (actor) (born 1947), English film and television actor
John Dicks (publisher) (1818–1881), English publisher

See also
John Dix (disambiguation)
John Dick (disambiguation)